English Gardner (born April 22, 1992) is an American track and field sprinter who specializes in the 100-meter dash. Her personal best of 10.74 seconds, set in 2016, ranks her in the top ten all-time for the distance.

Career
She was born in Philadelphia and grew up in Voorhees Township, New Jersey, where she graduated from Eastern Regional High School as part of the class of 2010. While running for the University of Oregon, in 2011 she set what should be the American junior record in the 100 meters at 11.03 (+0.6) set while winning the Pac-10 Championships. Her mark is superior to the listed record by Angela Williams from 1999, but that mark has not yet been ratified. She was a five-time NCAA champion with the Oregon Ducks track and field team, winning two 100 m titles, two 4×400 m titles, and an indoor 60 m dash title.

Gardner qualified for the 2013 World Championships in Athletics in Moscow after winning the 100 m at the 2013 USA Outdoor Track and Field Championships. Her time of 10.85 equalled the best time run in 2013 to that date by Barbara Pierre set earlier that same day in a semi-final. In Moscow, Gardner just missed the podium with a fourth-place finish in the 100 meters with a time of 10.97. She was a silver medalist with the United States in the 4×100-meter relay.

Gardner qualified for the 2015 World Championships in Athletics in Beijing after a runner up 100 m at the 2015 USA Outdoor Track and Field Championships.

Gardner won the 100 meters at the 2016 United States Olympic Trials in a time of 10.74 (+1.0).  In addition to qualifying her for the 2016 Summer Olympics, the time tied Merlene Ottey as the seventh fastest competitor in history.

Gardner finished 7th in the 100 meters at the 2016 Summer Olympics, running 10.94, and won gold in the 4 x 100 meters relay, running a combined 41.01.

Coaching in NCAA
Coach Gardner joined the Princeton University men's track & field coaching staff as a volunteer assistant in November 2018.
In February 2019, Princeton men won Ivy League team championship in Boston.
In May 2019, Princeton men won Ivy League team championship in Princeton, New Jersey.
In March 2020, Princeton men won Ivy League team championship in Ithaca, New York.
In October 2021, Princeton men won Ivy League team championship in Princeton, New Jersey.
In February 2022, Princeton men won Ivy League team championship in Fort Washington Avenue Armory in New York City.
In March 2022, Princeton men placed 5th 2022 NCAA Division I Indoor Track and Field Championships in Birmingham CrossPlex.
In May 2022, Princeton men won Ivy League team championship at Yale University.
In June 2022, Princeton men placed 7th 2022 NCAA Division I Outdoor Track and Field Championships in Hayward Field in Eugene, Oregon.
In October 2022, English Gardner shared her story.

Personal records
100-meter dash – 10.74 (2016)
200-meter dash – 22.62 (2013)
400-meter dash – 53.98 (2006)
60-meter dash indoor – 7.12 (2012)
200-meter dash indoor – 23.34 (2012)

National titles
USA Outdoor Track and Field Championships
100-meter dash: 2013, 2016
NCAA Women's Division I Outdoor Track and Field Championships
100-meter dash: 2012, 2013
NCAA Women's Division I Indoor Track and Field Championships
60-meter dash: 2012

International competitions

References

External links

 
 
 
 
 
 
 
 

1992 births
Living people
Eastern Regional High School alumni
People from Voorhees Township, New Jersey
Sportspeople from Camden County, New Jersey
Track and field athletes from Philadelphia
American female sprinters
African-American female track and field athletes
World Athletics Championships athletes for the United States
World Athletics Championships medalists
Oregon Ducks women's track and field athletes
Track and field athletes from New Jersey
Athletes (track and field) at the 2016 Summer Olympics
Olympic gold medalists for the United States in track and field
Medalists at the 2016 Summer Olympics
USA Outdoor Track and Field Championships winners
Medalists at the 2020 Summer Olympics
Olympic silver medalists for the United States in track and field
Athletes (track and field) at the 2020 Summer Olympics
Olympic female sprinters
21st-century African-American sportspeople
21st-century African-American women